Pablo Elvira (September 24, 1937 – February 5, 2000) was a Puerto Rican baritone. He performed with the New York City Opera and the Metropolitan Opera, and he was a strong supporter of opera in the state of Montana, where he co-founded the Intermountain Opera in Bozeman.

Life
Elvira was born on September 24, 1937, in San Juan, Puerto Rico, Puerto Rico. He began his musical career playing jazz trumpet there, with his uncle, Rafael Elvira, in his orchestra, he continued in his father's band and later started his own band who played at the Hotel San Juan. In 1966, he joined the voice faculty of the Indiana University School of Music; during his eight years there he performed baritone roles in many of the school's opera productions.

In 1974, Elvira made his first appearance with the New York City Opera. He debuted at the Metropolitan Opera in 1978 and performed there over 100 times during the next 12 years in works by Rossini, Donizetti, Verdi, Puccini, Berlioz and Leoncavallo. Elvira was a strong supporter of opera in the state of Montana. With Anthony Stivanello and Joe Bostick, he co-founded the Intermountain Opera Association of Montana in Bozeman, Montana, in 1979.

Elvira married Signe Landoe in 1975, and they moved to Bozeman, Montana, one year later. They had a son, Pablo. Elvira died on February 5, 2000, in Bozeman.

Discography 
 Casals: El Pessebre (Iglesias, Forrester; Casals; 1974) COL
 Montemezzi: L'amore dei tre re (Moffo, Domingo, Siepi; Santi, 1976) RCA
 Mascagni: Cavalleria rusticana (Scotto, Domingo; Levine, 1978) RCA

Videos 
 Puccini: Manon Lescaut (Scotto, Domingo; Levine, Menotti, 1980) [live]
 Donizetti: Lucia di Lammermoor (Sutherland, Kraus, Plishka; Bonynge, Donnell, 1982) [live]

References

External links 
Interview with Pablo Elvira by Bruce Duffie, November 23, 1985
 

1937 births
2000 deaths
People from San Juan, Puerto Rico
Puerto Rican opera singers
Singers from Montana
Operatic baritones
People from Bozeman, Montana
Indiana University faculty
20th-century American male opera singers